Maryland Mania was a soccer club based in Baltimore Maryland that competed in the A-League for one year, in 1999.  The Mania's original home was UMBC Stadium in Catonsville, but they club relocated to Anne Arundel Community College midway through the season.

Year-by-year

Coach
Justin Fashanu was hired to coach the Mania, but fled the United States during the pre-season when he was accused of sexually assaulting an underage boy. He was replaced as coach by Darryl Gee who was replaced by Paul Kitson during the season.

References

Defunct soccer clubs in Maryland
Soccer clubs in Baltimore
A-League (1995–2004) teams
Soccer clubs in Maryland
1999 establishments in Maryland
1999 disestablishments in Maryland
Association football clubs established in 1999
Association football clubs disestablished in 1999